The men's tournament in volleyball at the 1976 Summer Olympics was the 4th edition of the event at the Summer Olympics, organized by the world's governing body, the FIVB in conjunction with the IOC. It was held in Montreal, Canada from 18 to 30 July 1976.

Qualification

Pools composition

Rosters

Venues

Preliminary round

Pool A

|}

|}

Pool B

|}

* Egypt withdrew because of the Congolese-led boycott after they lost to Brazil 1–3 (5–15, 5–15, 15–13, 9–15) on 18 July. The result of that match was annulled.

|}

Final round

5th–8th places

5th–8th semifinals

|}

7th place match

|}

5th place match

|}

Final four

Semifinals

|}

Bronze medal match

|}

Gold medal match

|}

Final standing

Medalists

References

External links
Final Standing (1964–2000)
Results at Todor66.com
Results at Sports123.com

O
1976
Men's events at the 1976 Summer Olympics